Sirindhornia is a genus of moths belonging to the subfamily Olethreutinae of the family Tortricidae.

Species
Sirindhornia bifida Pinkaew & Muadsub, 2014
Sirindhornia chaipattana Pinkaew & Muadsub, 2014
Sirindhornia curvicosta Pinkaew & Muadsub, 2014
Sirindhornia pulchella Pinkaew & Muadsub, 2014

See also
List of Tortricidae genera

References

Enarmoniini
Tortricidae genera